Fayan or Fa Yan may refer to:

 Fayan, a Han dynasty text by Yang Xiong
 Fayan school, one of the Five Houses of Chán Buddhism